Ti rincontrerò may refer to:

 Ti rincontrerò (album), an album by Marco Carta
 "Ti rincontrerò" (song), a song from the album by Marco Carta